Monema coralina is a moth of the family Limacodidae. It is found in China (Yunnan, Xizang), Nepal and Bhutan.

The wingspan is 30–35 mm. The wings are reddish.

References

Moths described in 1895
Limacodidae
Moths of Asia